Maksym Veraksa (born 14 August 1984) is a paralympic swimmer from Ukraine competing mainly in category S12 events.

Career
Maksym competed in the 2008 Summer Paralympics and 2012 Summer Paralympics as part of the Ukrainian Paralympic team. There he competed in five events winning five medals, four of them gold. In the 100m Backstroke he finished third behind Russia's Alexander Nevolin-Svetov and fellow Ukrainian Sergii Klippert who both swam quicker than the previous world record.  Maksym however got revenge beating both athletes in the 50m and 100m freestyle, the 200m individual medley and beating Sergei in the 100m Breaststroke all in world record times. In the 2012 Games in London he won a further four medals, three of them gold.

References

External links
 

1984 births
Living people
Ukrainian male freestyle swimmers
Paralympic swimmers of Ukraine
S12-classified Paralympic swimmers
Paralympic gold medalists for Ukraine
Paralympic silver medalists for Ukraine
Paralympic bronze medalists for Ukraine
Swimmers at the 2008 Summer Paralympics
Swimmers at the 2012 Summer Paralympics
Swimmers at the 2020 Summer Paralympics
Medalists at the 2008 Summer Paralympics
Medalists at the 2012 Summer Paralympics
Medalists at the 2020 Summer Paralympics
Medalists at the World Para Swimming Championships
Medalists at the World Para Swimming European Championships
World record holders in paralympic swimming
Paralympic medalists in swimming
Ukrainian male medley swimmers
Ukrainian male backstroke swimmers
21st-century Ukrainian people